Tim Scott McConnell also known as Tim Scott or Footless (born March 23, 1958) is an American singer-songwriter and 12-string guitarist who performs since 2007 under the artist name Ledfoot and created the music genre Gothic blues. The artist's repertoire consists solely of self-written songs.

Two of his songs gained international popularity through other artists:
 "Swear" was covered by Sheena Easton for her 1984 album A Private Heaven.
 Bruce Springsteen recorded one of his songs, "High Hopes", on the Blood Brother EP (1996). The song, released by Springsteen as a single in November 2013, gave the title to his January 2014 studio album.

McConnell started touring at the age of 15.  He got his first recording contract with Sire Records in 1982. He then recorded for Geffen on his next record in 1985, called "High Lonesome Sound". McConnell headed the LA-based band The Havalinas. The band recorded one album The Havalinas and a live album called Go North. After the break-up of The Havalinas, McConnell did a series of solo albums and toured with a band. In 2007, he released his first Ledfoot album and started touring heavily in Europe solo.  He plays mainly solo with the Ledfoot project up until today. Since 2010 Ledfoot has had a close musical relationship with Ronni Le Tekrø that culminated in the 2020 duo album A Death Divine.

Discography

1981: The Rockats Live at the Ritz – Island Records
1983: Tim Scott Swear – Sire Records
1985: Tim Scott High Lonesome Sound – Geffen
1990: The Havalinas The Havalinas – Elektra
1991: The Havalinas Go North – Mo Records
1995: Tim Scott Deceivers & Believers – Warner Music
1997: Tim Scott Everywhere I´ve Been – Waterfall Records
2002: The MoMac Trio MoMac Trio – Farmen
2005: Tim Scott 13 songs – Farmen
2007: Ledfoot  Devils songbook – Grappa/ Blue Mood Records
2009: Ledfoot  Damned – Vox Records
2011: Ledfoot  Gothic Blues – Vox Records
2019: Ledfoot  White Crow – TBC Records
2020: Ledfoot & Ronni Le Tekrø  A Death Divine – TBC Records
2021: Ledfoot  Black Valley – TBC Records

Most popular singles
 "High Hopes" (High Lonesome Sound & The Havalinas)
 "Swear" (Swear) AUS #44 
 "Wicked State of Mind (Damned)
 "Purgatory Road" (Damned)
 "Diggin My Own Grave" (Devils Songbook)

Ledfoot and the Gothic Blues 

As Ledfoot McConnell developed his own music style, the "Gothic Blues", between 2004 and 2007. This new style could not be defined by any existing music genre, so he invented a name for it. It is characterized by the unique artist's appearance: black clothes, shiny white hair, silver jewelry and a body full of tattoos – many of which designed by the artist himself. He sings with expressive and strong voice, plays the 12-string mostly in Bb minor tuning with porcelain slide and steel finger picks. Extra heavy strings contribute to a unique, strong sound. Frequently Ledfoot adds some extra rhythm with his stomp box. Lyrics and melody are most often dark, atmospheric, describe the blues, and worries of modern time human beings.

References

External links
 

1958 births
20th-century American singers
21st-century American singers
American blues guitarists
American blues singers
American folk guitarists
American male guitarists
American folk singers
American male singer-songwriters
American rock guitarists
American rock singers
Living people
Singer-songwriters from Florida
20th-century American guitarists
21st-century American guitarists
Guitarists from Florida
20th-century American male singers
21st-century American male singers